Robert Elliot (born 30 April 1986) is a professional footballer who is currently a technical director and goalkeeper for Gateshead. Elliot also played for the Republic of Ireland national team.

Elliot began his career with Erith Town, before joining Charlton Athletic's academy side. Whilst at Charlton, he was sent out on loan to Bishop's Stortford and Notts County, and also spent two loan spells at Accrington Stanley, where he was nicknamed "The Dilsh". He would then go on to be Charlton's first choice goalkeeper for a number of seasons, until he joined Newcastle United on transfer deadline day in the summer of 2011. Signed mainly as a back-up to Tim Krul, he featured for the club sporadically, but became first choice in the 2015–16 season after Krul suffered a season-ending injury.

Through the origins of his father's family, Elliot became eligible to represent the Republic of Ireland national football team, and was first called up in 2013, making his debut the following year. Elliot retired from the first team in 2017.

In June 2020 Elliot was released by Newcastle United after nine years. In January 2021, Elliot signed for Watford until the end of the 2020–21 season. In June 2021, Elliot signed a new 2-year contract with Watford.

Club career

Charlton Athletic
Born in Greenwich, London, Elliot began his career with non-League side Erith Town before moving to Charlton Athletic, the team he had supported as a child, when he was 17. After becoming a professional player with the Addicks in 2004, he was sent out on loan twice during the 2004–05 season; first to Bishop's Stortford and then Notts County, where he made his Football League debut.

The following season, Elliot spent most of the season on loan at the Conference National club Accrington Stanley, replacing fellow Charlton goalkeeper Darren Randolph who had been on loan at Stanley earlier in the year. He was part of the Accrington Stanley team which won promotion to the Football League as runaway champions, saving a vital penalty from Woking's Justin Richards in the match which guaranteed them promotion. He joined Stanley again on loan during the 2006–07 season, but failed to displace Ian Dunbavin as the club's first choice goalkeeper. He was voted the best keeper of the past decade for Accrington Stanley in 2010 by numerous key figures for the club, including manager John Coleman.

Back at Charlton, Elliot was considered to be behind Nicky Weaver and Darren Randolph for most of the 2007–08 season. After Randolph moved to Bury on loan Elliot was promoted to second choice. He made an unexpected debut for Charlton on 5 April 2008 after Weaver had been sent off in a match against Plymouth Argyle. He made his first start for Charlton in a League Cup defeat to Yeovil Town in August 2008. During the 2008–09 season, he displaced Weaver and established himself as the club's first choice goalkeeper. A string of impressive performances contributing to a record breaking start to a season for Charlton in 2009–10 led to him signing a contract extension committing him to the club until 2012. In August 2011, Newcastle United made an offer of £100,000 which was rejected by Charlton.

Newcastle United
On 30 August 2011, Elliot signed for Newcastle United on a five-year contract, becoming their seventh summer signing. He then stated his desire to become first choice 'keeper. He made his Newcastle debut on 20 September against Nottingham Forest in the Football League Cup.

At the start of the 2012–13 season, Elliot changed his squad number from 35 to 21, which was previously worn by Fraser Forster. He made his second Newcastle appearance in the Europa League on 20 September against Marítimo. His third Newcastle appearance, and second of the season, came in a third round League Cup tie away at Manchester United. On 24 February 2013, and following an injury to Tim Krul, Elliot made his first Premier League appearance for the Magpies, starting against Southampton in a 4–2 victory. During the match, after conceding a goal in the third minute, he then assisted a Papiss Cissé wonder goal in the first half. On 12 May, Elliot was sent off against Queens Park Rangers, following a second yellow card.

Elliot started the 2015–16 season as third choice 'keeper behind Krul and Karl Darlow. However, with Krul suffering a season-ending injury and Darlow still recovering from an ankle knock, Elliot was handed his first appearance of the season on 18 October at home to Norwich City, helping Newcastle to a 6–2 win, their first win of the campaign. Before the game, it was revealed that Elliot had signed a 'new, long-term contract' back in January 2014. Elliot continued his run in the team, keeping successive clean sheets against Stoke City and AFC Bournemouth, the latter performance earning him the man-of-the-match award in a 1–0 win. This was the first time Newcastle had kept two clean sheets in a row in two years and their first away win in ten months.

On 29 March 2016, whilst on international duty, Elliot sustained an anterior cruciate ligament injury, and was ruled out of action for six months, ending his hopes of a place on the Republic of Ireland squad for UEFA Euro 2016.

On 7 September 2016 he extended his contract with the Magpies until 2020. Elliot returned to the Newcastle squad in December, but by then, Darlow had usurped him as the first choice 'keeper. For the next two months, he was not involved in the first team, but did make two appearances for the reserves. From February 2017 onwards, Elliot would be on the bench until 24 April, when Darlow himself was benched due to squad rotation. Elliot's first appearance of the season came in a 4–1 win over Preston North End. On 28 April, he was named captain against Cardiff City, keeping a clean sheet as Newcastle won 2–0. On 7 May, he again kept a clean sheet, as Newcastle beat Barnsley 3–0, edging out Brighton & Hove Albion by a point to win the Championship.

On 11 August 2017, Elliot's shirt number was changed from 21 to 1 in the 2017–18 squad number announcement, replacing Tim Krul, who had been linked with a permanent move to Brighton & Hove Albion.

Elliot never made an appearance in the 2018–19 season, having lost his place in the side to Martin Dúbravka.

Watford
On 28 January 2021, Elliot signed for Watford on a contract until the end of the 2020–21 season. In June 2021, Elliot signed a new two-year contract with Watford.
Elliot made his debut for Watford in a League Cup tie against Stoke City on 21 September 2021, his first competitive game since 2017. On 28 June 2022, Elliot was released on a free transfer following Watford's relegation to the Championship at the end of the 2021–22 season having only made one competitive appearance for the club.

Gateshead
On 11 August 2022, Elliot joined Gateshead as Technical Director. He was also registered as a first-team player.

International career
Elliot, who was born in England, is eligible for the Republic of Ireland through his father's family from Cork, and represented Ireland at under-19 level. On 5 October 2013, he received his first call-up to the Republic of Ireland senior squad as a replacement for the injured Darren Randolph for the games against Germany and Kazakhstan. Elliot won his first international senior cap for the Republic of Ireland on 25 May 2014, in a 2–1 home loss to Turkey. He pulled out of the Republic of Ireland senior squad in November 2017, citing family reasons.

Career statistics

Club

International

Honours
Accrington Stanley
Conference National: 2005–06

See also
 List of Republic of Ireland international footballers born outside the Republic of Ireland

References

External links

Profile at the Newcastle United F.C. website
Rob Elliot profile at the Football Association of Ireland website

1986 births
Living people
Footballers from Greenwich
English footballers
Republic of Ireland association footballers
Republic of Ireland youth international footballers
Republic of Ireland international footballers
Association football goalkeepers
Erith Town F.C. players
Charlton Athletic F.C. players
Bishop's Stortford F.C. players
Notts County F.C. players
Accrington Stanley F.C. players
Newcastle United F.C. players
Watford F.C. players
Gateshead F.C. players
English Football League players
National League (English football) players
Premier League players